Dicosmoecus is a genus of october caddis in the family Limnephilidae. There are about six described species in Dicosmoecus.

Species
These six species belong to the genus Dicosmoecus:
 Dicosmoecus atripes (Hagen, 1875)
 Dicosmoecus gilvipes (Hagen, 1875)
 Dicosmoecus jozankeanus (Matsumura, 1931)
 Dicosmoecus obscuripennis Banks, 1938
 Dicosmoecus palatus (McLachlan, 1872)
 Dicosmoecus pallicornis Banks, 1943

References

Further reading

 
 
 

Trichoptera genera
Articles created by Qbugbot
Integripalpia